The Favàritx Lighthouse is an active lighthouse on the Spanish island of Menorca.

See also 

 List of lighthouses in Spain
 List of lighthouses in the Balearic Islands

References

External links 
 Comisión de faros
 Balearic Lighthouses

Lighthouses in the Balearic Islands
Buildings and structures in Menorca
Lighthouses completed in 1916